AWAL (an initialism of Artists Without a Label) is a British music distribution company owned by Sony Music Entertainment. The company serves as an alternative to the traditional music label deal, offering deal structures to artists and independent labels without them giving up ownership or control. In 2021, Sony Music Entertainment purchased AWAL from Kobalt Music Group for $430m.

Services
AWAL's main service is digital music distribution, but also includes marketing, physical distribution, data analytics, radio, and synchronization licensing. AWAL's artists keep their music and creative rights, unlike the traditional record label. In November 2018, Billboard wrote an article titled, "Can Kobalt Disrupt the Label Game With AWAL?," outlining the company's approach and how it pays out as much as 80 percent of streaming revenue to its artists. In March 2017, AWAL introduced its music analytics app designed to collect and display data from an artist's presence on Spotify and Apple Music.

History
AWAL was originally founded in 1997 by record producers Kevin Bacon and Jonathan Quarmby. In December 2011, AWAL was acquired by the Kobalt Music Group and operated as the company's digital music distribution arm.

In January 2018, Lonny Olinick was named CEO of Kobalt's recording division. By March 2018, Kobalt announced it was investing $150 million into AWAL and that all of Kobalt's recording business will be combined under the AWAL brand. AWAL acquired In2une Music in June 2018, which provides multi-format radio promotion to independent labels and artists. AWAL announced a strategic partnership with independent label, Glassnote Records, in November 2018. Other notable announcements from the company include signing artists such as You Me At Six, Austin Burke, deadmau5, Little Simz, The Night Cafe, Kevin Garrett, Gabrielle Aplin, Gus Dapperton, and Ella Vos.

In November 2018, AWAL was named to Billboard's 2018 Digital Power Players - Music Groups list.

AWAL has offices in London, New York, Los Angeles, Atlanta, Berlin, Hong Kong, Miami, Nashville, Stockholm, and Sydney. In December 2018, AWAL announced it was opening an office in Toronto.

On September 7, 2021, the Competition and Markets Authority, the United Kingdom's antitrust regulator, raised concerns that Sony's purchase of AWAL would reduce competition from other distributors. The CMA gave Sony and AWAL five days to address the CMA's concerns and offer legally binding remedies, or else the CMA would enter a Phase 2 investigation. The phase two investigation was launched on September 16, 2021.

Artists

 1S1K SeanMario
 Aly & AJ
 Alaina Castillo
 Banks
 Ber
 Bonesteel
 BurrSoCold
 Bruno Major
 Claudia Alende
 Corrupt Colour
 Dayglow
 Daði Freyr
 De La Soul
 Die Antwoord
 Everything Everything
 The Aubreys
 Frank Carter & The Rattlesnakes
 Gabrielle Aplin
 Girl in Red
 Greyson Chance
 Gus Dapperton
 Jowynalex
 Joshua Morata
 Jungle
 Jae Jin
 Jesse McCartney
 JPEGMAFIA
 JVKE
 iamamiwhoami
 ionnalee
 Katelyn Tarver
 Kira Kosarin
 Kyle Dion
Laufey
 Laura Marling
 Lauren Jauregui
 Lauv
 Lil Peep
 Lisa Heller
 Little Simz
 Lizzy McAlpine
 LOKRUMENTAL
 Lovejoy
 Maximum Love
 Moby
 mxmtoon
 Naked Eyes
 Nick Cave and the Bad Seeds
 Now United
 Pritam Mandal
 Pouya
 Quadeca
 R3HAB
 Rex Orange County
 Rickie Lee Jones
 Shandell Crutchfield
 Spacey Jane
 Steve Lacy
 The Kooks
 The Night Café
 The Wombats
 Thom Yorke
 Todd Terje
 Tom Misch
 Vérité
 YEAROFJORDN
 You Me at Six
 Yung Bans
 Zolita

Record labels

 Glassnote Records
 mau5trap
 EEM Records
 Good Soldier Songs
 Nickelodeon Records
 Natsukashii Records
 B-Unique Records
 SideOneDummy Records
 World in Red (personal label for Girl in Red)

Albums released

  SUGA  (2019) — Kyle Dion
 Sunlight — Spacey Jane
  Crystal Cabaret  (2022) — Joshua Morata
 Retrograde Vol.1 (2023) — Shandell Crutchfield

References

External links
 

Online music stores of the United Kingdom
Record label distributors
Companies based in London
British independent record labels
Record labels established in 1997
2011 mergers and acquisitions
2021 mergers and acquisitions
Sony Music